Julia Mary Avis (born 2 February 1963) is a female former track and field athlete who competed for England in the discus throw.

Athletics career
Avis became the British and English champion in 1985 when she won both the 1985 UK Athletics Championships and the AAA Championships in the discus.

Avis represented England in the discus event, at the 1986 Commonwealth Games in Edinburgh, Scotland.

References

1963 births
Living people
English female discus throwers
British female discus throwers
Commonwealth Games competitors for England
Athletes (track and field) at the 1986 Commonwealth Games